Setapak High School (Malay: Sekolah Menengah Kebangsaan Tinggi, Setapak) is a secondary school in Kuala Lumpur, Malaysia. Established in 1955, it is an all-boys school, with the exception of the coed Sixth Form. In the local community, the school is known as High School and Setapak High. When first established, it was located in High Street, Kuala Lumpur (hence its name), before moving to its current location in Setapak in 1963.

The school is active in the sports arena, especially in the inter-school hockey championships.

History
The school was established in 1955 with the name High Street School, which was located at High Street (later Jalan Bandar, now Jalan Tun H S Lee) in the heart of Kuala Lumpur. It was opened on 12 January 1955 by Dato' Othman bin Mohamed, the Menteri Besar (chief minister) of Selangor at that time. Sultan Hisamuddin Alam Shah, the Sultan of Selangor, officially opened High Street School on 11 April 1955.

Mr. Luke, the Selangor Education Officer, was instrumental in the formation of the school. The first headmaster was Mr. Herman M de Souza, a former teacher of VI. The school's motto was "Lead By Leading" and the medium of instruction was English.

The school complex, built in 1893, formerly housed Victoria Institution (VI) until 1929 when VI moved to its new premises in Petaling Hill.  The Technical College (now known as Universiti Teknologi Malaysia) occupied the complex in 1930 and remained there until 1954 when it moved to Gurney Road (now Jalan Semarak).   In 1955, the complex became High Street School.

In addition to normal lessons, the school had classes in commercial subjects such as Shorthand, Typewriting and Bookkeeping. It also had lessons on carpentry, metal works and technical drawings. The first batch of students to sit for the Cambridge School Certificate did so in 1959. They also sat for the full London Chamber of Commerce Intermediate School Certificate examination. This was encouraged by the headmaster Mr Herman de Souza who was the class teacher for the first batch of Form One students and continued teaching them as their class teacher until they reached Form Five in 1959.

In 1962, the school moved to make way for the construction of an overhead bridge. While waiting for the new school buildings to be completed, the students were placed temporarily in St. John's Institution in the afternoon session for two school terms from April 1962 until the end of that year. According to ex-students' accounts, this was where school's rivalry with St. John's began.

In January 1963, High Street School moved to its present location in Setapak, Kuala Lumpur. The new school building was officially opened by the Minister of Education, Mr. Mohamed Khir Johari, on 15 April 1968. The school had also dropped the "Street" from its name to become High School Kuala Lumpur. Since then, it has been affectionately known as 'High School' and is the only school in Kuala Lumpur to use the tag even up until today in the age of Sekolah Menengah Kebangsaan.

The present school badge was the second one since 1968. Mr. Kevin de Souza, Head of Arts in 1968, designed the first school badge.

The school motto was changed to "Ilmu Tangga Kemajuan" (Knowledge is Key to Improvement) in the 1980s. In 2002, it was changed again to "Setapak di Hadapan" (One Step Ahead).

The building that the school first resided on at High Street was utilised by the Kuala Lumpur Traffic Police in the 1980s. However, the building was virtually abandoned when a new multi-storey building for the traffic police was built next to it. In the evening of 29 July 1999, the old school building was razed by fire, believed to have been started by drug addicts hiding in the building that was supposedly locked.    It has since been rebuilt on the remaining concrete columns, walls and foundation that survived the fire.

Traditions
The first batch of students consisted of about 100 students from the feeder schools viz the Pasar Road Government English School and the Batu Road Government English School. The students who passed the Standard Six  Government Examination and who were not selected for the Victoria Institution were enrolled here. The first batch of students had the luxury of small classes (25 per class) and ample space for Science Labs, workshops and resource centres. The school hours were extended to 4 pm to enable the students to learn extra skills, and use the resource centre.

It was the first school to use colours to name the classes instead of Class A, B, C, etc. The best student were in one class identified by a colour and the rest divided equally in the other classes. Thus there was no "feelings" of being in the "D" class. This was also one of the first schools to have a school uniform with a coloured pants and the school badge sewn on to the shirt. Another first was to make all students wear the red school neck tie daily. In the other schools only the Prefects wear the neck tie.

The Pipes and Drums were set up in the 1970s by the Canadian Pioneers, which in turn were a spin-off from the Scottish Highlanders. The Pipes and Drums were the pride and joy of the school as it epitomised almost military discipline with artistic ability. In almost all activities, the school band led the way.

Anthem
The school anthem titled Ilmu Tangga Kemajuan was composed by Loo Siew Kuan and Rozita bt. Ramli who were Sixth Form students.

Principals

Administration
 Academic staff
 Non-academic staff
 Prefects
 Librarians
 Prefects for Self-Access Centre (SAC)
 Yearbook Editorial Board
 Board of Class Monitors
 Co-operative
 Sixth-Formers Board
 Guidance and Counselling Unit
 Abdul Rahman Talib Hostel

Uniform bodies
 Fire Brigade Cadets
 Persatuan Kadet Bersatu Malaysia
 Kadet Remaja Sekolah
 Malaysian Red Crescent Society
 Police Cadets
 Seni Silat Gayong
 Setapak High School: Corps of Pipes and Drums (Setapak Highlanders) Pipe Band
 St. John Ambulance of Malaysia
 Taekwondo
 Pioneer Cadets (Pelupur)

References

External links
 

Secondary schools in Malaysia
Boys' schools in Malaysia
Publicly funded schools in Malaysia
1955 establishments in Malaya
Educational institutions established in 1955